A wingspan is the distance between the wingtips of a flying animal or aircraft.

Wingspan may also refer to:

Music
Wingspan (Mulgrew Miller album), 1987
Wingspan: Hits and History, a 2001 Paul McCartney compilation

Periodicals
Wingspan (magazine), of Birds Australia
Wingspan, All Nippon Airways' in-flight magazine

Other media
Wingspan (board game), a 2019 card-driven bird-themed game
Wingspan (video game), a 2020 digital adaptation
Wingspan (film), a 2001 television documentary about Paul McCartney's career
Wingspan (Transformers), a character from The Transformers  television series

Other uses
Wingspan, another term for arm span
Wingspan Bank, a defunct American Internet bank
Wingspan National Bird of Prey Centre, a New Zealand falconry attraction on Mount Ngongotahā